Gregory Louis LaFleur (born September 16, 1958) is a former American football tight end in the National Football League. LaFleur was selected in the third round by the Philadelphia Eagles out of Louisiana State University in the 1981 NFL Draft. LaFleur has also been a member of the Indianapolis Colts and St. Louis Cardinals. He had career statistics of 64 Receptions and 3 Touchdowns. He is the father of former NBA center Robert Sacre.

In 1995 he served as the national spokesperson for the Kennedy Center Alliance for Arts Education.  LaFleur was the athletic director at Texas State University from 2001 to 2004 and Chicago State University from 2004 to 2005.  He was the athletic director at Southern University from 2005 until April 6, 2011. In 2016, LaFleur ran for mayor-president of Baton Rouge and the  East Baton Rouge Parish.

References

1958 births
Living people
American football tight ends
Chicago State Cougars athletic directors
Indianapolis Colts players
LSU Tigers football players
Southern Jaguars and Lady Jaguars athletic directors
St. Louis Cardinals (football) players
Texas State Bobcats athletic directors
Sportspeople from Lafayette, Louisiana
Players of American football from Louisiana